The Sviatoshynsko–Brovarska line is the first line of the Kyiv Metro, dating back to 1960. It includes some of the system's more historically significant stations, like Arsenalna, which at 105.5 meters  is the deepest in the world and the next station Dnipro, which although the tunnel follows a descent, appears above ground level.

All of the stations on the eastern bank of the Dnieper river are either ground or above ground level, this attributed to a similar experiment like Moscow's Filyovskaya line. Here the warmer Ukrainian climate prevented the stations there from being severely deteriorated, which was why extensions in 1968 and 1979 were kept from going underground. The five original stations are extremely beautiful in architecture and decoration as they managed to survive Nikita Khrushchev's struggle with decorative "extras".

The Svyatoshynsko–Brovarska line cuts Kyiv on an east–west axis and presently comprises 18 stations. It is usually coloured red on the maps.

History

Timeline

Name changes

Stations 
 Akademmistechko
 Zhytomyrska
 Sviatoshyn
 Nyvky
 Beresteiska
 Shuliavska
 Politekhnichnyi Instytut
 Vokzalna
 Universytet
 Teatralna → Zoloti Vorota 
 Khreshchatyk → Maidan Nezalezhnosti 
 Arsenalna
 Dnipro
 Hydropark
 Livoberezhna
 Darnytsia
 Chernihivska
 Lisova

Transfers
Traditional Soviet metro planning stipulated the creation of the first line, which would at some point in the future be expanded and crossed by future planned lines. Specifically, the Sviatoshynsko–Brovarska line has two transfer stations, although a couple more are planned for connection to future perspective lines of the metro system:

Rolling stock

The line is served by the Darnytsia depot (No. 1) although before 1965, a converted tram depot located under the Dnipro station was used, after the completion of the Metro Bridge, the depot was dismantled. Currently 28 five-carriage train sets are assigned to the line. Most of them are type E, Ezh, Ezh1, Em-501 and Ema-502 built during the late
1960s and the early 1970s. The line was once served by carriages of type D, which were later given to Saint Petersburg metro. In 2014, some of the trains were refurbished and converted into type
81-7080/7081 or E-KM, with new engines, interior and exterior.

Future plans
Since the line has the oldest stations in the system, some show heavy marks from nearly half a century of exploitation and need for renovations. This includes replacement of escalators, lighting and in some cases the decoration. In particular, this concerns the surface stations which are exposed to weather elements. One of the which is Darnytsia which in the future is to become an important transfer station for three lines, has recently undergone a complete reconstruction, with an addition of a new western entrance.

Other projects include additional new entrances for Vokzalna and a planned one for Teatralna.

References

External links

  Sviatoshynsko–Brovarska line, Kyiv Metro official site
  Sviatoshynsko–Brovarska line, pictures, history, descriptions of all stations

Kyiv Metro lines
Railway lines opened in 1960
1960 establishments in Ukraine